Events from the year 1945 in Denmark.

Incumbents
 Monarch – Christian X
 Prime Minister – 
 until 5 May: German military rule 
 5 May-7 November Vilhelm Buhl
 starting 7 November: Knud Kristensen

Events
 21 March – The British Operation Carthage, an air raid targeting the local Gestapo headquarters in the Shell Building in central Copenhagen, goes wrong and 125 Danish civilians, including 80 school children, are killed.
 5 May – The occupation of Denmark ends with Nazi Germany's capitulation to the Allied Forces.
 12 December – The David Foundation and Collections is founded as an independent institution by C. L. David with his art collection on public display at the top floor of his home in Kronprinsessegade in Copenhagen as the focal point of its activity.

Sports
 AB wins their fifth Danish football championship by winning the 1944–45 Danish War Tournament.

Births
 18 January – Kirsten Klein, photographer
 26 January – Vibeke Sperling, journalist
 24 February – Mikael Salomon, film director, cinematographer
 21 March – Henrik Nordbrandt, poet (died 2023)
 10 May – Morten Bo, photographer
 23 October – Kim Larsen, singer-songwriter (died 2018)

Deaths
 15 January  – Holger Damgaard, photographer (born 1870)
 21 February – Anne Marie Carl-Nielsen, sculptor (born 1863)
 5 March – Albrecht Schmidt, film actor (born 1870)
 30 April – Gudmund Nyeland Brandt, landscape architect (born 1878)
 10 September – Otto Scavenius, diplomat, Foreign Minister for one day during the Easter Crisis of 1920 (born 1875)
 17 November
Elna Munch, feminist, suffragist and politician, one of the three first women to be elected to the Danish parliament in 1918 (born 1871)
 Jens Olsen, clockmaker, locksmith and astromechanic, constructor of the World Clock in Copenhagen City Hall (born 1872)

References

 
Denmark
Years of the 20th century in Denmark
1940s in Denmark
1940 in Europe